The Kosovka is a river in Krasnoyarsk Krai, Russia. It is a left tributary of the Chuna.

References

Rivers of Krasnoyarsk Krai